The College of Human Ecology is one of the eleven degree-granting units of the University of the Philippines at Los Baños. It is one of only a few institutions in Asia that offers a degree program in Human Ecology and is the first and only one to offer the degree in the Philippines. It is also the first in Asia to offer a degree program in Food and Nutrition Planning.

CHE aims to develop "professionals who understand human development in relation to the biophysical and social environment, are able to participate in development programs, internalize and apply the ecological perspective to society’s problems; as well as produce human resource who understand nutrition management, and nutrition program planning, implementation, and evaluation."

History

CHE is one of the few human ecology degree programs offered in Asia. In 1974, the Institute of Human Ecology (IHE) in UPLB was established in response to the call of Stockholm Conference for a “common outlook and principle to inspire and guide the people and the world in preservation and enhancement of human environment. It then became College of Human Ecology by 1983. 

Currently, the alumni of the College who take the Environmental Planning Board Examination still maintain a higher passing rate as compared to the national average. The College has also consistently recorded 100% passing rates in the Nutritionist-Dietitian Board Examination given by the Philippine Professional Regulation Commission since 2008.

Research and Extension

The College developed and currently administers the Regional Training Program on Food and Nutrition Planning for the United Nations Food and Agriculture Organization and the Netherlands Universities Foundation for International Cooperation. It aims to establish a pool of human resources in Asia who are fully capable of integrating nutrition considerations into development planning and management. It is the first in Asia to offer a degree program on Food and Nutrition Planning which has trained hundreds from all over the continent since its inception in 1978.

CHE also conceptualized the Nutrition Improvement Model, which led to the development of Barangay Integrated Development Approach for Nutrition Improvement (BIDANI) Program. BIDANI is now a component of the Philippine Plan of Action for Nutrition for building capacities of local governments to integrate nutrition into local development programs.

Degree Programs
 PhD Nutrition
 MS Family Resource Management
 MPS Food and Nutrition Planning
 MS Applied Nutrition
 BS Human Ecology (Majors: Human Settlement Planning; Social Technology; Family Development)
 BS Nutrition

References
UPLB College of Human Ecology
University of the Philippines Los Baños
Barangay Integrated Development Approach for Nutrition Improvement

Human ecology
Educational institutions established in 1974